These are the full results of the 2020 South American Indoor Championships in Athletics which took place in Cochabamba, Bolivia, on 1 to 2 February at the Estadio de Atletismo del Gobierno Autónomo Municipal de Cochabamba.

Men's results

60 meters
1 February

200 meters
2 February

400 meters
1 February

800 meters
2 February

1500 meters
1 February

3000 meters
2 February

60 meters hurdles
1 February

4 × 400 meters relay
2 February

High jump
2 February

Pole vault
2 February

Long jump
1 February

Triple jump
2 February

Shot put
1 February

Women's results

60 meters
1 February

200 meters
2 February

400 meters
1 February

800 meters
2 February

1500 meters
1 February

3000 meters
2 February

60 meters hurdles
1 February

4 × 400 meters relay
2 February

High jump
2 February

Pole vault
1 February

Long jump
1 February

Triple jump
2 February

Shot put
1 February

References

South American Indoor Championships in Athletics - Results
South American Indoor Championships in Athletics